MVSD may refer to:

Mid Valley School District in Lackawanna County, Pennsylvania
Mountain View School District in Susquehanna County, Pennsylvania
Mountain View School Division in the Parkland Region of Manitoba, Canada